The Queen of Sheba's Palace is one of several places popularly held to be the residence of the legendary Queen of Sheba. It may refer to:

 Dungur, archaeological site in Aksum, Ethiopia
 Khor Rori (Sumhuram), archaeological site in Dhofar, Oman
 Saba' Palace, Aden, Yemen